Standard Model is the title of an exhibition held between 1 October and 25 October 2009 at the Nordin Gallery, Stockholm. The exhibition was made in collaboration between Swedish artist Karl Tuikkanen and London based Australian artist David Brazier and represents the first physical manifestation of their artistic partnership exploring ideas of communication and collaboration mediated through the internet.

Process
Central to the artists’ process has been mining the public information resource Wikipedia, allowing for the logic of the network to develop the content of the exhibition. Beginning with the Wikipedia page for ‘standard model’ the artists used the system of selecting and sending Wikipedia links between Stockholm and London to quickly take them to destinations far removed from their points of departure.

Reminiscent of surrealist strategies of “stream of consciousness” and “Exquisite Corpse” Tuikkanen and Brazier relinquish authorial control, choosing instead to hand it over to the web based dialogue and the content of internet links. In doing so, coherence and rationality is discarded for a logic which follows loose associations, without hierarchy or proof of authenticity.

Links
Each artist began with the Wikipedia page for ‘Standard model’. From there the artist would select a link and send it to the other artist who would repeat the process until the final information page was six times removed from the original Wikipedia page for ‘standard model’. The information that emerged through this process provided the content for works made and exhibited. This process was repeated 12 times.

The chain of links for each work is shown below.

Chain 1

Standard model,
Global symmetry,
Culture of the United Kingdom,
Great fire of London,
Bubonic Plague,
Unit 731,
North Korean human experimentation

Chain 2

Standard model,
Fundamental interaction,
Big bang theory,
Natural philosophy,
Book of Optics,
Ockham’s razor,
God of the Gaps

Chain 3

Standard model,
Momentum,
Roman numerals,
Dionysius Exiguus,
Herod the Great,
Scabies,
Parasitism

Chain 4

Standard model,
CERN,
The 39 Clues,
KGB,
Julius and Ethel Rosenberg,
Anti Americanism,
Formaldehyde

Chain 5

Standard model,
Antimatter,
Positron emission tomography,
Alzheimer disease,
Herpes simplex,
Aloe vera,
Hybrid

Chain 6

Standard model,
Matter,
Dark energy,
Hubble Space Telescope,
Konstantin Tsiolkovsky,
Science fiction,
The Man in the High Castle

Chain 7

Standard model,
Nobel Prize in Physics,
X-ray,
Strategic Defense Initiative,
Disinformation,
Mossad,
Operation Wrath of God

Chain 8

Standard model,
Penguin diagram,
1991,
Iraq disarmament crisis,
Niger uranium documents,
Plame affair,
Operation Merlin

Chain 9

Standard model,
Unsolved problems in physics,
Multiple universes,
Fine-tuned universe,
Creationism,
Free will,
Laplace demon

Chain 10

Standard model,
Theory of everything,
Stephen Hawking,
Nerdcore hiphop,
Nerdapalooza,
Pixelh8,
Colossus computer

Chain 11

Standard model,
Wikipedia: Verifiability,
Peer review,
Thomas Kuhn,
International relations,
Power transition theory,
Asian Century

Chain 12

Standard model,
Sheldon Glashow,
Jew,
Zionism,
Bar Kokhba revolt,
Dead Sea scrolls,
Copper Scroll

External links

Gallery website
 Standard Model Exhibition at Nordin Gallery

Surrealism
 What is Surrealism? Lecture by Breton, Brussels 1934
 Manifesto of Surrealism by André Breton. 1924
 Exquisite Corpse

Scientific organisations
 CERN European Organization for Nuclear Research

Visual arts exhibitions
Culture in Stockholm